The Etnyre was an American automobile manufactured by the Etnyre Motor Car Company in Oregon, Illinois from 1910 until 1911 .

E.D. Etnyre had a road-building machinery business when he announced in late 1908 that he would soon build a modestly priced car.  When the car arrived in 1910, the price was now $3500 and came with a 7.7 liter 50 hp four-cylinder engine of the company's own design.  Touring, roadster, and other body-styles were offered on the same 128"  wheelbase.

According to the founder's daughter, Harriet, 10 cars total were made, four of which were worn out by her brothers during the "testing" phase.

Frequently seen on automobile lists spelled as Entyre, the correct spelling is Etnyre.

References

Motor vehicle manufacturers based in Illinois
Defunct motor vehicle manufacturers of the United States